John Patrick "Soldier Boy" Murphy (May 20, 1879-April 20, 1949) was an infielder in Major League Baseball. He died in 1949 and is buried at the Immaculate Conception Cemetery in Lawrence, Massachusetts.

Teams
 St. Louis Cardinals 1902
 Detroit Tigers 1903

References

Sources

1949 deaths
Major League Baseball shortstops
St. Louis Cardinals players
Detroit Tigers players
Year of birth unknown
Lawrence Colts players
Haverhill Hustlers players
Lynn Shoemakers players
1879 births
Baseball players from New Haven, Connecticut
Oswego (minor league baseball) players